Ehrenberg is a municipality in the district of Fulda, in Hesse, Germany.

Geography

The municipality is located in the centre of the wildlife park "Hessische Rhön" in a level of 450 up to 900 meters and approx. 30 km from Fulda. Most of its districts are situated in the valley of the river Ulster and are crossed by the interstate road B278. Only Reulbach is in another valley.

Neighbouring municipalities

Ehrenberg touches the municipalities Hilders (rural district Fulda) in the north, Birx (Thuringia), the town Fladungen (Bavaria), the municipality Hausen (also Bavaria) and the town Oberelsbach (also Bavaria) the east, the town Gersfeld (district Fulda) in the south and the municipality Poppenhausen (district Fulda) in the west.

Districts

Melperts

 180 inhabitants (2004)
 principal: Gertrud Faulstich
 average level: 540 m

The smallest village of the municipality is characterized by prevailing agriculture. In the centre of the village there is a bakehouse where the annual Melpertser Bakehousefestival is taking place. In Melperts there is a pottery.

Reulbach

 450 inhabitants (2004)
 principal: Roland Hohmann
 average level: 570 m

Seiferts

 650 inhabitants (2004)
 principal: Peter Wehner
 average level: 530 m

Thaiden

 340 inhabitants (2004)
 principal: Martin Barthelmes
 average level: 500 m

Wüstensachsen

 1380 inhabitants (2004)
 principal: Thomas Keidel
 average level: 580 m

References

Municipalities in Hesse
Fulda (district)